Montet may refer to:

 Places
 Montet,  a municipality in the district of Glâne in the canton of Fribourg in Switzerland
 Le Montet, a commune in the Allier department in Auvergne in central France
 Les Montets, a municipality in the district of Broye, in the canton of Fribourg, Switzerland

 People
 Numa F. Montet (1892–1985), US Representative from Louisiana
 Pierre Montet (1885–1966), French Egyptologist